Levan Koshadze (born 18 January 1993) is a Ukrainian football midfielder who plays for Cherkashchyna-Akademiya Bilozirya.

Koshadze is officially listed as Georgian on a website of the Football Federation of Ukraine, while having a Ukrainian citizenship. He also was allowed to play for the Second League team where foreign players are not allowed.

Career
Koshadze started to play in Georgia, particularly for Adeli Batumi. Since 2013 he lives and plays football in Ukraine. On 20 July 2017 Koshadze was recognized as the best player of the first round in the 2017-18 Ukrainian First League.

References

External links

Profile at Ukrainian Football (history and statistics).

1993 births
Living people
Footballers from Tbilisi
Ukrainian footballers
Footballers from Georgia (country)
Georgian emigrants to Ukraine
FC Cherkashchyna players
FC Kremin Kremenchuk players
Association football midfielders
Georgia (country) youth international footballers